Corinth is an unincorporated community and Ghost Town in Big Horn County, Montana, United States.

History

Corinth was an agricultural community with a grain elevator and train stop. As with many towns and communities of its type, it declined with changes to more reliable transportation technologies and it was no longer needed as a pick up station.

The Corinth townsite is located along Fly Creek, northwest of Hardin. The old store and post office building from Corinth has been restored and moved to the grounds of the Big Horn County Museum in Hardin. The post office was active from 1915 to 1953. Some historic buildings are still onsite, though many, including the elevator, have been dismantled.

Notes

Unincorporated communities in Big Horn County, Montana
Unincorporated communities in Montana
Ghost towns in Montana